Roy Lake State Park is a South Dakota state park in Marshall County, South Dakota in the United States.  The park is divided in two sections on Roy Lake, and is open for year-round recreation including camping, beaches, swimming, fishing, hiking and boating. The Roy Lake Resort & Lodge is located in the park. Boat ramps are available and visitors can rent boats from the resort.

There are 100 campsites on two campgrounds and 3 cabins.

The name of Roy Lake recalls an incident when a dog named Roy drowned at the lake.

References

External links
 Roy Lake State Park

Protected areas of Marshall County, South Dakota
State parks of South Dakota